Edgard Pierre Jozef Farasyn (also spelled Farasijn; 14 August 1858, in Antwerp – 22 March 1938, in Antwerp) was a Belgian painter, watercolorist, engraver and etcher who specialized in seascapes, landscapes, genre scenes and interior portraits. In his later life, he became interested in depicting fishermen.

Life and work
He received his artistic training at the Royal Academy of Fine Arts (Antwerp), where he studied under Nicaise de Keyser. In 1885, he became a teacher at the Academy. Six years later, he was a founding member of the secessionist group De XIII and was also active in Weest U Zelve (roughly, Be Yourself), a group devoted to promoting Flemish art.

He initially focused on painting children, but switched to plein air painting after becoming a teacher. He mostly worked in and around Antwerp, but also went to Mol and the Kempen region and occasionally ventured into Zeeland. His early works are mostly done in dark, sombre colors, but his canvas lightened considerably after he visited Koksijde and decided to portray the lives of the fishermen and their families.

He also practiced mural painting. Of special note is the painting Optocht van de rederijkerskamer "De Violieren" in 1539 (Procession of the Chamber of Rhetoric "The Violieren" in 1539), in the staircase hallway of the Antwerp Town Hall, which he executed in 1899 at the invitation of Frans Van Kuyck; part of a larger project of historical murals which also included works by Piet Verhaert, Edouard de Jans, Karel Boom and Henri Houben.

He gave many exhibitions, winning awards at the Sydney International Exhibition (1879) and the Brussels International (1897). He retired from teaching in 1924.

References

Further reading
 W. G. Flippo, Lexicon of the Belgian Romantic painters; International Art Press, Antwerp, 1981
 Léon Tombu, Peintres et Sculpteurs Belge à l'Aube du XXe Siècle. Liège, Auguste Bénard, 1907
 C. Lemonnier, L'école belge de peinture : 1830-1905, Brussels, Labor, 1991 (first edition, Van Oest, 1906).
 Paul Colin, La peinture belge depuis 1830, Brussels, Editions des Cahiers de Belgique, 1930

External links

 ArtNet: Seven pages of paintings by Farasyn
 Commentary on Farasyn in the Quarterly Illustrator, Vol.2 @ Google Books

1858 births
1938 deaths
19th-century Belgian painters
19th-century Belgian male artists
20th-century Belgian painters
Academic staff of the Royal Academy of Fine Arts (Antwerp)
Royal Academy of Fine Arts (Antwerp) alumni
20th-century Belgian male artists